Gymnastics at the 2011 Southeast Asian Games was divided into three sub-categories: artistic gymnastics, rhythmic gymnastics, and aerobics. Artistic and Rhythmic Gymnastics were held at the Ranau Gymnastic Hall while Aerobics were held at the Dempo Hall, Palembang, Indonesia.

Medal winners

Artistic
Men

Women

Rhythmic
Women

Aerobic

Medal table

External links
Southeast Asian Games Official Results

2011 Southeast Asian Games events
Gymnastics at the Southeast Asian Games
2011 in gymnastics
International gymnastics competitions hosted by Indonesia